Clinton Howard Swindle (November 20, 1945 – June 9, 2004), also known in his writing as Howard Swindle, was an investigative journalist and editor for The Dallas Morning News and an author of six books.

Early life
Clinton Howard Swindle was born in Houston, TX on November 20, 1945. He was born to Clinton Swindle and Woodye Shipman. At around age 13, Clinton and Woodye divorced, and Howard and Woodye moved to Hamilton, TX, as one of Woodye's brothers, Howard Shipman, owned a ranch in the nearby ranching town of Indian Gap, TX.
Attending Hamilton High School and playing on the Bulldogs football and basketball teams, Howard Swindle would work weekends at Howard Shipman's ranch in Indian Gap. Though he looked at Howard Shipman as a stern and stingy man, he would later describe working on the ranch as some of the best years of his life, and was promised along with his brother, Jimmy Swindle, that they would split the land after his uncle. 
Told it was not worthwhile to go to college by a high school counselor, Howard Swindle was later accepted into the University of North Texas, and studied journalism. Shortly after graduation from UNT (1968), he worked for a short time at the Lubbock Avalanche-Journal.

Vietnam
Vietnam definitely impacted Howard Swindle, and even his writing. His first book, Once a Hero, published in 1991 nonetheless, was about a helicopter pilot in Vietnam who robbed banks using helicopters. 
Told by his brother Jimmy Swindle that Howard would probably soon be drafted, Howard Swindle enlisted in the United States Navy in 1968, hoping not to be drafted into the Army or Marines, as the casualty rates were rising in the overseas conflict. Awarded Honorman of his basic training company, Howard Swindle went to a signal intelligence school at Corey Field in Pensacola, FL, and was later assigned to the USS Oklahoma City, a cruiser patrolling the Gulf of Tonkin in North Vietnam. One of his later stories involved receiving a message from President Nixon, to give to the Commander of the Seventh Fleet before Operation Moneypenny, or the mining of Haiphong Harbor.
After serving a longer-than-usual tour of 14 months, Howard Swindle was honorably discharged from the Navy, and returned to Dallas, where he got a job at The Dallas Times Herald, which he lost in the mid-70s over a dispute with an editor over a news story.

Books and awards
Once a Hero (1991)
Deliberate Indifference: A Story of Racial Injustice and Murder (1992)
Trespasses: Portrait of a Serial Rapist (1996)
America's Condemned: Death Row Inmates in Their Own Words (1999, with Dan Malone)
Doin' Dirty (2000)
Jitter Joint (1999) - later made into the movie D-Tox (a. k. a. Eye See You) (2002)

Swindle was Edgar-nominated, and received three Pulitzer Prizes for The Dallas Morning News.

Death
Swindle underwent surgery for esophageal cancer in 1999 and for lung cancer in 2002. His lung cancer recurred in 2003, and he died on June 9, 2004 in Stephenville, Texas.

American male journalists
20th-century American journalists
1945 births
2004 deaths
Deaths from lung cancer
Deaths from cancer in Texas
The Dallas Morning News people
20th-century American novelists
American male novelists
20th-century American male writers
20th-century American non-fiction writers